Jon Wise (born 25 March 1977) is a British television critic. From 2002 to 2005 he worked as a showbiz/TV reporter and real-life feature writer for news agencies and The Daily/Sunday Sport. He currently writes a TV column for The People as well as working as their TV feature reporter. He has been branded as "the Wiseman of TV" for his outspoken style. He has also appeared on various TV shows.

References

1977 births
Living people
British television critics